James Y. McKee (June 20, 1836 – December 24, 1891) was acting President of the Pennsylvania State University, serving from the resignation of Joseph Shortlidge in 1881 until 1882.

References
 Penn State Presidents and their achievements

1836 births
1891 deaths
Presidents of Pennsylvania State University